James Anthony FitzPatrick (February 26, 1894 – June 12, 1980) was an American producer, director, writer, and narrator, known from the early 1930s as "The Voice of the Globe" from his Fitzpatrick's Traveltalks.

Biography 

James Anthony FitzPatrick was born in Shelton, Connecticut. After completing training in dramatic arts, he worked for a while as a journalist. In 1916, he entered into films by starting the Juvenile Film Company, in Cleveland, producing comedy shorts featuring children, anticipating by years similar series such as Our Gang and The Little Rascals. However, the series was not a success; by 1921, FitzPatrick was working as a writer/director in Charles Urban's American Kineto concern, making a series titled "Great American Authors," which featured profiles of famous American writers. However, Kineto folded in 1924, and in 1925 FitzPatrick established his own company and undertook two concurrent series: "Famous Music Masters" — dramatized shorts about the lives of famous composers — and "Songs Of." These were distributed worldwide, and some were later synchronized to sound.

In 1930, FitzPatrick began filming travel documentaries for British and American viewers. Metro-Goldwyn-Mayer distributed the series under the title "FitzPatrick Traveltalks." Beginning with 1934's Holland in Tulip Time, the Traveltalks were filmed in Technicolor, making this series one of the first regular vehicles for color film in the American film industry. After FitzPatrick left MGM in 1954, he produced a similar series for Paramount Pictures, titled "Vistavision Visits," for about another year before retiring. He died at the age of 86 in Cathedral City, California.

Legacy 
FitzPatrick made nearly 300 films in a career that spanned five decades. He was, in some ways, the heir to Charles Urban's approach to making travelogues: they concentrated on the picturesque elements of a nation visited — architecture and landscape, but not so much the people.

FitzPatrick also relates to Charles Urban in his advocacy of color, which he first employed in Charles Gounod (1928), a film in the Famous Music Master Series.

With the coming of television, Hollywood began to reduce its reliance on short subjects, and many shorts departments began to close. FitzPatrick owned his own unit and managed to survive longer than many internal studio units, but the handwriting was on the wall by the time he bowed out. FitzPatrick Pictures produced only five features, and three of these were intended for release only in the UK. The last one, Song of Mexico (1945), was released by Republic Pictures. In the 21st century, the Traveltalks are notable for preserving cityscapes before many of them had skyscrapers or international hotel chains, and ways of life that are now defunct, though these are presented in a very general way. The Traveltalks are still often shown today on Turner Classic Movies as filler material between features.

On his 1958 Parlophone record The Best of Sellers, Peter Sellers performed "Balham, Gateway to the South", a parody of Fitzpatrick travelogues, written by Frank Muir and Denis Norden, and produced by George Martin.

In 1960, he was awarded a star on the Hollywood Walk of Fame.

Selected filmography 

 Songs of Ireland (1926)
 Siam to Korea (1931)
 Holland in Tulip Time (1934)
 Switzerland, The Beautiful (1934)
 Zion: Canyon of Colour (1934)
 Ireland: The Emerald Isle (1934)
 Zeeland: The Hidden Paradise (1934)
 Colorful Guatemala (1935)
 Los Angeles: Wonder City of the West (1935)
 Beautiful Banff and Lake Louise (1935)
 Honolulu: The Paradise of the Pacific (1935)
 Victoria and Vancouver: Gateways to Canada (1936)
 Cherry Blossom Time in Japan (1936)
 Rio de Janeiro: City of Splendour (1936)
 Quaint Québec (1936)
 Yellowstone Park: Nature's Playground (1936)
 Oriental Paradise (1936)
 Picturesque South Africa (1937)
 India on Parade (1937)
 Glimpses of Java and Ceylon (1937)
 Colorful Bombay (1937)
 Hong Kong: The Hub of the Orient (1937)
 Serene Siam (1937)
 Rocky Mountain Grandeur (1937)
 Floral Japan (1937)
 Glimpses of Peru (1937)
 Stockholm: Pride of Sweden (1937)
 Chile: Land of Charm (1937)
 Copenhagen (1937)
 Glimpses of Austria (1938)
 Beautiful Budapest (1938)
 Czechoslovakia on Parade (1938)
 Paris on Parade (1938)
 Cairo: City of Contrast (1938)
 Madeira: Isle of Romance (1938)
 Ancient Egypt (1939)
 Imperial Delhi (1939)
 Java Journey (1939)
 Rural Hungary (1939)
 Picturesque Udaipur (1939)
 Colorful Curacao (1939)
 Old Natchez on the Mississippi (1939)
 Night Descends on Treasure Island (1940)
 Seattle: Gateway to the Northwest (1940)
 Calling on Colombia (1940)
 Modern New Orleans (1940)
 Suva: Pride of Fiji (1940)
 Glimpses of Mexico (1940)
 The Capital City: Washington D.C. (1940)
 Cavalcade of San Francisco (1940)

 Old New Mexico (1940)
 Old New Orleans (1940)
 Mediterranean Ports of Call (1941)
 Glimpses of Florida (1941)
 George Town: Pride of Penang (1941)
 Scenic Grandeur (1941)
 Minnesota: Land of Plenty (1942)
 Colorful North Carolina (1942)
 Glacier Park and Waterton Lakes (1942)
 Picturesque Massachusetts (1942)
 Modern Mexico City (1942)
 Glimpses of Ontario (1942)
 Mighty Niagara (1943)
 Romantic Nevada (1943)
 Motoring in Mexico (1943)
 A Day in Death Valley (1944)
 Mackinac Island (1944)
 Colorful Colorado (1944)
 Roaming Through Arizona (1944)
 Modern Guatemala City (1945)
 Merida and Campeche (1945)
 Visiting Vera Cruz (1946)
 Looking at London (1946)
 Over the Seas to Belfast (1946)
 Glimpses of California (1946)
 Calling on Costa Rica (1947)
 On the Shores of Nova Scotia (1947)
 Chicago, the Beautiful (1948)
 Night Life in Chicago (1948)
 Ontario: Land of Lakes (1949)
 Calling on Michigan (1949)
 Roaming Through Northern Ireland (1949)
 Glimpses of Old England (1949)
 A Wee Bit of Scotland (1949)
 Pastoral Panoramas (1950)
 Roaming Through Michigan (1950)
 To the Coast of Devon (1950)
 Touring Northern England (1950)
 Life on the Thames (1950)
 Romantic Riviera (1951)
 Visiting Italy (1951)
 Life in the Andes (1952)
 Beautiful Brazil (1952)
 Land of the Taj Mahal (1952)
 Ancient India (1952)
 Pretoria to Durban (1952)
 Calling on Cape Town (1952)
 Johannesburg: City of Gold (1953)
 Looking at Lisbon (1953)
 Delightful Denmark (1953)
 In the Valley of the Rhine (1953)
 Beautiful Bavaria (1953)
 Land of the Ugly Duckling (1953)
 Seeing Spain (1953)
 Glimpses of Western Germany (1954)

Home video availability 
In 2016, Warner Bros. Home Entertainment has released the entire series of shorts in the DVD-R format, as Fitzpatrick Traveltalks (three volumes). Individual shorts can also be found as extras on DVDs of classic Warner Bros. owned films of the period:

 Los Angeles: Wonder City of the West is on the DVD of Sylvia Scarlett
 Cherry Blossom Time in Japan is on the DVD of China Seas
 Paris on Parade is on the DVD and Blu-Ray of An American in Paris
 Modern New Orleans and Old New Orleans are on the DVD of The Toast of New Orleans
 Cavalcade of San Francisco is on the DVD of Go West
 Glimpses of Florida is on the DVD of Lady Be Good
 Looking at London is on the DVD of The Three Musketeers
 Glimpses of California is on the DVD of Till the Clouds Roll By
 Chicago, the Beautiful and Night Life in Chicago are on the DVD of In the Good Old Summertime
 Roaming Through Michigan is on the DVD of Three Little Words
 Romantic Riviera is on the DVD of Easy to Love
 Land of the Taj Mahal and Ancient India are on the DVD of Kim
 Land of the Taj Mahal is on the DVD of The Prisoner of Zenda (1937 and 1952 dual-disc version)

References

External links 
 
 

1894 births
1980 deaths
American male journalists
20th-century American journalists
People from Shelton, Connecticut
Film directors from Connecticut
Film producers from Connecticut